Sándor Hollán may refer to:

Sándor Hollán, Sr., Hungarian politician (1846-1919)
Sándor Hollán, Jr., Hungarian politician (1873-1919)
Sándor Hollán (painter) (Alexandre Hollan), Hungarian-French painter (b. 1933)